Pénéssoulou is a village and arrondissement in the commune of Bassila in the Donga Department of western Benin. It is located on the RMIE 3 highway.

External links
Satellite map at Maplandia

Arrondissements of Benin
Populated places in the Donga Department
Commune of Bassila